Jinxter is an interactive fiction video game developed by Magnetic Scrolls and published by Rainbird in 1987 for 8-bit and 16-bit home computers of the time. Jinxter tells the story of a man on a mission to save the fictional land of Aquitania from the looming threat of evil witches. The game was well received by critics upon its release.

Gameplay

Jinxter is a text-based adventure, where the player controls the protagonist character by typing in command sentences. Most versions use graphics for illustrations, with the exception of the text-only Spectrum +3 and Apple II versions. It was famous for its quirky, eccentric humour, as many of the textual descriptions are very long and have a humorous aspect. Each of the five charms provides a magic spell, and the words to trigger these spells are common placeholder names. Unlike many other text adventures, in Jinxter the player character almost never dies during the course of gameplay (the only exception to this rule is at the game's final confrontation). However, the player can lose some luck and be unable to complete the game later on.

Plot
The game is a science fantasy comedy set in the fictional country of Aquitania, which bears a strong resemblance to early-to-middle 20th century Britain. The central characters in the story are the Guardians, immortal guardian angel-like beings who look after and help people. The Guardians - members of ARSE, the Association of Registered Stochastic Executives - are described as liking to wear herringbone overcoats and eat cheese sandwiches. Centuries ago the country was threatened by the rising dark power of the wicked Green Witches until the good magician Turani created a magical object, called the Bracelet, which holds luck and distributes it throughout Aquitania to limit and keep in check the witches' magic, banning the dangerous parts of the witchcraft and rendering them relatively harmless. However, the new high witch Jannedor has enough of the restraints. She has obtained and disassembled the Bracelet, stripped it of its five magical charms and hid them in various places (the bracelet itself is worn by Jannedor), waiting for its powers to be weakened enough it could be destroyed so she would fulfill her schemes of jinx and conquest. If the charms of Turani are not reunited soon with the legendary Bracelet of Turani then luck could completely run out and the witches will regain all of their old magic and the country will again fall under their influence.

The player character is, pretty much accidentally, recruited by the Guardians to rescue his friend Xam, who was kidnapped by the witches, retrieve the charms, fix the Bracelet, and then use its powers against Jannedor to kill her and destroy her castle, thus defeating the witches and restoring luck to Aquitania. Once Jannedor's evil ambitions are put to an end, however, the player's character is put back just where he was before he began his adventure—in front of a speeding bus—and killed.

Development 
Jinxter was originally conceived as an answer to Infocom's Enchanter and was created by a relatively large development team. The game was originally written by the sister of Magnetic Scrolls' founder Anita Sinclair, Georgina, who had previously written the novella A Tale of Kerovnia for The Pawn. However, due to a falling out between them, the whole text had to be rewritten in three weeks by Michael Bywater, who had previously written the What Burglar magazine for The Guild of Thieves and then helped with Corruption. The game's package contents included The Independent Guardian newspaper written by Bywater.

Reception
Jinxter received positive reviews, including the rating scores of 70% from Amiga Computing, 7/10 from Amiga User International, 88% from Amstrad Action, 8/10 from Power Play, 9/10 from Commodore User, 37/40 from Computer & Video Games, 89% from Computing with the Amstrad, 92% from Crash, 92% from The Games Machine 9/10 in Your Sinclair, and 83% from Zzap64. The game was also a commercial success. In 1998, ACE featured it on the list of 100 Top Games as "an odd adventure decorated with beautiful graphics." However, in 1996, Computer Gaming World ranked its ending as the 14th least rewarding of all time, as "even when the player won, the protagonist died."

References

External links
 
 
 Jinxter at the Hall of Light (HOL)
 

1980s interactive fiction
1987 video games
Acorn Archimedes games
Amiga games
Amstrad CPC games
Amstrad PCW games
Apple II games
Atari 8-bit family games
Atari ST games
Classic Mac OS games
Commodore 64 games
DOS games
Magnetic Scrolls games
Science fantasy video games
Single-player video games
Telecomsoft games
Video games about witchcraft
Video games developed in the United Kingdom
ZX Spectrum games